The following list of Carnegie libraries in Puerto Rico provides detailed information on the United States Carnegie library in Puerto Rico, where one library was built from one grant (totaling $100,000) awarded by the Carnegie Corporation of New York in 1916.

Carnegie libraries

Notes

References

Note: The above references, while all authoritative, are not entirely mutually consistent. Some details of this list may have been drawn from one of the references (usually Jones) without support from the others.  Reader discretion is advised.

Puerto Rico
Libraries
Libraries
Libraries in Puerto Rico